Ferdinand Jacob Lindheimer (May 21, 1801 – December 2, 1879) was a  German Texan botanist who spent his working life on the American frontier. In 1936, Recorded Texas Historic Landmark number 1590 was placed on Lindheimer's grave.

Biography

Early life
Ferdinand Jacob Lindheimer was born to merchant Johann Hartmann and Jahnette Magdeline Reisser Lindheimer on May 21, 1801 in Frankfurt, Germany. Lindheimer was educated at the Frankfurt Gymnasium, a Berlin preparatory school, the University of Wiesbaden and the University of Jena. He received a scholarship in Philology at the University of Bonn.

Political activism
In 1827 Lindheimer became a teacher at the Bunsen Institute in Frankfurt, where he became an active proponent of governmental reform of Germany. He became one of the Dreissiger refugees who left Germany after participation in the failed Frankfurt Putsch insurrection in 1833. In 1834, Lindheimer arrived in Belleville, Illinois, whence he traveled by boat to New Orleans.

Texas residency
Lindheimer and several companions began traveling to Texas, but were diverted to Mexico where he lived and worked for more than a year. Here he lived in the German colony in Veracruz where he learned about Mexican botany. The German colony in "El Mirador" was founded by Karl Sartorius near a large Italian colony in Huatusco.  He spent over a year here with the German migrants in Mexico learning as much about the bountiful Mexican flora.  Late in 1835 he departed Mexico as the Texas Revolution was beginning and was shipwrecked on the coast near Mobile, Alabama. Lindheimer headed to Texas and arrived at the San Jacinto battlefield the day after the final battle of the Texas Revolution.

In 1844 he met Prince Carl of Solms-Braunfels, Germany, who was making final arrangements for the settlement of a German colony in Texas, which would be known as New Braunfels, Texas.  Lindheimer lived the remainder of his life in New Braunfels.

Meusebach and Hermann Spiess of the Darmstadt Society of Forty chose the location for Bettina in 1847 on the banks of the Llano River.  Lindheimer was a botanist residing in this colony. The Fisher–Miller Land Grant commune was named in honor of Bettina von Arnim, an early feminist activist and a personal friend of the Meusebach family.

Botanist
 

During the late 1830s and early 1840s, Lindheimer collected botanic specimens in Texas, part of this time for Dr. Asa Gray of Harvard University.  Lindheimer persuaded Wilhelm Bruckisch of the Silesian Beekeepers Society to bring black Italian bees to Texas for pollination of the fruit trees in the Guadalupe River valley.

Lindheimer collected fifteen hundred species in the south Texas area, over a period of thirteen years.

In New Braunfels, Lindheimer began a friendship with fellow botanical enthusiast John O. Meusebach, who appointed him director of a New Braunfels botanical garden.  After resigning as Commissioner-General of the Adelsverein, Meusebach moved from New Braunfels to some acreage he had bought at Comanche Springs in Bexar County, believed to be in the vicinity of current-day Camp Bullis.  Lindheimer and Meusebach made botanical collections at Comanche Spring, with Lindheimer's 1849 collections bearing the Comanche Spring place tag.  After Meusebach retired to Loyal Valley, Lindheimer was a frequent visitor who exchanged botanical specimens for evaluation with Meusebach.

Newspaper editor
In 1852, Lindheimer was hired as an editor, and along with Adolph Douai, helped found the German-language newspaper known as the Die Neu-Braunfelser Zeitung.

Death and legacy

Lindheimer died December 2, 1879 in New Braunfels.

He is known as the Father of Texas Botany, with over 20 species and one genus bearing his name.

The Lindheimer House in New Braunfels is preserved as a public museum and operated by the New Braunfels Conservation Society.  The house was added to the National Register of Historic Places in 1970.

A subspecies of snake, Pantherophis obsoletus lindheimeri, is named in his honor.

See also
 List of Darmstadt Society of Forty

Footnotes

Further reading
 Rudolph Leopold Biesele, The History of the German Settlements in Texas, 1831-1861.  Austin, TX: Press of Von Boeckmann-Jones Co., 1930.
 Oscar Haas, History of New Braunfels and Comal County, Texas, 1844-1946. Austin, TX: Steck Company, 1968.
 Irene Marschall King, John O. Meusebach: German Colonizer in Texas. Austin, TX: University of Texas Press, 1967.
 Glen E. Lich, The German Texans. Austin, TX: University of Texas Press, 1996.
 George J. Morgenthaler, The German Settlement of the Texas Hill Country.  Boerne, TX: Mockingbird Books, 2007.
 John E. Williams, The Writings of Ferdinand Lindheimer. Texas Botanist, Texas Philosopher, Texas A & M University Press, 2020, .

External links

A biography
Biography in the Handbook of Texas

1801 births
1879 deaths
19th-century German botanists
German emigrants to the Republic of Texas
People from New Braunfels, Texas
German-American culture in Texas
Recorded Texas Historic Landmarks